Don Bosco School, Bandel is an all-boys, English medium school in Sahaganj, Hooghly, West Bengal, India. It was established in 1978 and run by the Salesians of Don Bosco which is a congregation within the Catholic Church. The school operates under the Council for the Indian School Certificate Examinations. It is one of the international Don Bosco "family of schools".

The first Don Bosco Institution in India was set up in Thanjavur, Tamil Nadu by the Salesians in the early 1900s. The school is a Christian Minority Institution, recognized by the National Commission for Minority Educational Institutions, Government of India (Vide. F. No. 1508 of 2006, dated 18/01/2007) and Department of Education of the government of West Bengal, and is affiliated to council for the Indian School certificate examination, New Delhi, (School Code WB 085) for the Indian Certificate for Secondary Education Examinations (ICSE) and the Indian School Certificate Examinations.

The current principal is Fr. Siby Vadakel, SDB.

Campus
Don Bosco Bandel is the largest educational complex in the district Hooghly. It is situated on the banks of the river Hooghly and is adjoining to the Bandel Basilica, one of the landmarks of West Bengal.  The school building comprises multiple wings that house the junior section, the senior section, the auditorium, the library and staff rooms, the assembly hall, the senior and junior AV room, the Seminary Hall, the seminary, physics lab, chemistry lab, biology lab, the school basilica, etc

Aim

According to the school's prospectus:
The aim of the institution is to impart sound value based education by forming in the boys habits of piety, virtue, discipline and self-reliance during the years of their studies

Curriculum 
The school follows the Indian Certificate of Secondary Education Board until class 10. For classes 11 and 12, a student must follow the Indian School Certificate curriculum and may choose to study:

 Science Stream - English, Physics, Chemistry, Mathematics, Biology and Computer Science.

 Commerce - English, Mathematics, Economics, Principles of Accounts, Structures of Commerce, Business Studies, and Bengali or Hindi or Physical Education.

 Humanities- English, History, Political Science, Sociology, Economics, Mathematics, and Bengali or Hindi or Physical Education.

For more information visit https://www.dbbandel.org/curriculum.php

Notable faculty
 Dasgupta (Bengali)
 Adhikary (Physics)
 Subir Banerjee (Mathematics, Chemistry)
 Nirmal Gomes (Mathematics)
 Shampa Chakraborty (English)
 Lipika Bose (English)
 Gomes (English)
 Tasmin Amin (History)
 Neelanjana Banerjee (Geography)
 Champak Mondal (History)
 N.D. Jacob (Economics)
 Kaushik Das (Computer Science)
 Apurba Banerjee (Accounting and Commerce).
 K P MUKHERJEE (Mathematics)
 SUBRATA BANERJEE (Physics)

Extracurricular activities

 Bosco Xprezns is an inter-school fest hosted during July.
 Bosco Quirous is an inter-school quiz competition hosted during July-August.
 The school has also won several inter-school quiz competitions like the Limca book of records, Borunvita quiz contest and the Maggi inter-school quiz competition.

Sports accolades
Over the years the school has participated in various inter-school sporting events like athletics, football and cricket championships. Some of the students have represented the District and State teams. Notable sportspersons from the school are Amit Sharma (Cricket - Bengal U 16 & U 19), Rajesh Roychowdhury (Cricket - Bengal U 16, Hooghly district), Mayuk Dasgupta (Cricket - Captain Burdwan University, East Zone Universities (Vizzy Trophy) & Hooghly district), Ambarish Thakur and Ajit Singh. The school continues to nurture its sporting talent and provide every student with necessary sports infrastructure.

Club activities 
The school has various forms of club activities focusing on the extra-curricular activities. These clubs hold activities during the course of the year.

The main clubs operating within the school are:-

 Leadership Training Service.
 Don Bosco Bandel Scouts Group and Cubs.
 Science Club
 Social Service Club
 Sports Club
 Arts Club
 Cyber Club
 Quiz Club
 Friends Club
 Literary Club
 Music Club
 Nature Club.

References

External links
 
 Bosco Xprezns 2021 Website

Salesian schools
Catholic schools in India
Boys' schools in India
Primary schools in West Bengal
High schools and secondary schools in West Bengal
Christian schools in West Bengal
Schools in Hooghly district
Educational institutions established in 1978
1978 establishments in West Bengal